The battle of Scardon was a battle during the Gothic War of Justinian I, near Skradin. In it a Roman force under Constantinianus defeated an Ostrogothic force under Uligisalus. After Asinarius approached with a combined Suevi-Gothic army Constantinianus retreated to Salona to which the Goths laid siege.

References

Gothic War (535–554)
Scardon
Scardon
History of Dalmatia
Scardon